Michaels is a patronymic surname meaning "son of Michael". A common English language surname, it is rare as a given name. There are other spellings. People with the name Michaels include:

Academics
 Patrick Michaels (1950–2022), American research professor specializing on the influence of climate on agriculture

Arts and entertainment
 Al Michaels (born 1944), American television sportscaster
 Barry Michaels (born 1952), American radio personality
 Bret Michaels (born 1963), American lead vocalist of the band Poison
 Dan Michaels (born 1963), American producer, record company owner, saxophonist/Lyriconist; member of the rock band The Choir
 David Michaels (actor) (born 1964), British actor
 Jesse Michaels (born 1969), American songwriter, guitarist and artist
 Kevin Sean Michaels (born ?), Producer
 Lorne Michaels (born 1944), Canadian television producer, writer and comedian
 Margaret Michaels (born ?), American actress
 Mia Michaels (born 1966), American choreographer
 Nick Michaels (born ?), Canadian broadcaster, writer, actor and producer
 Randy Michaels (born ?), American broadcaster and entrepreneur
 Sean Michaels (writer) (born 1982), Canadian writer and novelist
 Sean Michaels (pornographic actor) (born 1958), American pornographic actor
 Tammy Lynn Michaels (born 1974), American actress
 Trina Michaels (born 1982), American actress

Business
Howard Michaels (1955–2018), American real estate businessman

Literary
 Fern Michaels (born 1933), American novelist
 James Michaels (1921–2007), American journalist and Forbes Magazine editor
 Leigh Michaels (born 1954), American novelist
 Leonard Michaels (1933–2003), American writer
 Walter Benn Michaels (born 1948), American literary theorist

Sports
 Chris Michaels (born 1961), American professional wrestler
 Cody Michaels (born ?), American wrestler
 Jason Michaels (born 1976), American MLB outfielder
 Jillian Michaels (born 1974), American fitness expert and TV personality
 Joseph Michaels (born ?), American soccer player
 Lou Michaels (1935–2016), American football player
 Meredith Michaels-Beerbaum (born 1969), American, equestrian show jumper for Germany
 Rick Michaels (born 1974), American professional wrestler
 Shawn Michaels (born 1965), American professional wrestler
 Stephen Michaels (born 1987), Australian rugby player
 Walt Michaels (1929–2019), American, former football player, former head coach of New York Jets

Other
 The Michaels, Canadians, public name used to refer to the duo of Michael Stark and Michael Leshner
 Mark A. Michaels and Patricia Johnson, writers on sexuality and relationships

See also
 Michals
 Michels
 St. Michaels
 Mikhaylov

References

Patronymic surnames
Surnames from given names